State Road 281 (NM 281) is a  state highway in the US state of New Mexico. NM 281's northern terminus is at NM 104 near Las Vegas, and the southern terminus is at the end of state maintenance by McAllister Lake.

Major intersections

See also

References

281
Transportation in San Miguel County, New Mexico
Las Vegas, New Mexico